Sami Al-Baker (born 4 September 1971) is a Saudi Arabian fencer. He competed in the individual sabre event at the 1992 Summer Olympics.

References

External links
 

1971 births
Living people
Saudi Arabian male sabre fencers
Olympic fencers of Saudi Arabia
Fencers at the 1992 Summer Olympics